Step-siblings are children born of two different families who have been joined by marriage, A male step-sibling is a stepbrother and a female is a stepsister. The step-siblings relationship is connected through law and is not a blood relation.

Step-siblings are sometimes abbreviated informally as stepsibs.

Culture
In many fairy tales, the central character has a stepmother and the step-siblings serve as an extension of their mother. Cinderella and Mother Hulda features wicked stepsisters who take after their parents. The story Kate Crackernuts serves as a counterexample where the daughter of the evil stepparent is a loving stepsister. 

Many romance novels feature heroes who are the stepbrother of the heroine. The step-relationship generally stems from a marriage when the hero and heroine are at least in their adolescence. 

Some family films and television sitcoms feature a blended nuclear family including siblings as the center premise. In many cases, the step-family is large and full of children causing situations such as sibling rivalry, rooming, falling in love, and getting along amongst the children as popular plot-lines. This premise gained traction with the 1968 films Yours, Mine and Ours and With Six You Get Eggroll and the 1969 launch of the television sitcom The Brady Bunch. Some contemporary family sitcoms have made the blended family sitcom more popular with the TGIF show Step by Step bringing about other shows such as Aliens in the Family, Life with Derek, Drake & Josh, and the short-lived NBC family sitcom Something So Right. The Life of Riley is a 2009 British comedy television series, shown on BBC One & BBC HD. It focuses on the lives of a blended family. Kevin and Kell is a comic strip that focuses on a blended family. The Disney Channel animated series Phineas and Ferb also prominently features a blended family, chosen by co-creator Jeff "Swampy" Marsh in part due to its under-use in children's programming, and his personal experiences growing up in such a family.

References

External links

Stepfamily
Sibling